The 1968–69 Los Angeles Kings season was the second ever for the Los Angeles Kings in the National Hockey League. After finishing a surprising second place during the 1967–68 season, the Kings stumbled in their second regular season, finishing with a 24–42–10 record, good for 58 points and fourth place in the six-team Western Division. The Kings made the playoffs, losing in the West Division Final to the St. Louis Blues.

Offseason
The Kings acquired goaltender Gerry Desjardins from the Montreal Canadiens in June, giving up two first-round picks. Goaltender Terry Sawchuk was traded to the Detroit Red Wings in October for Jimmy Peters, Jr. On the same day the Kings picked up goaltender prospect Wayne Thomas of the University of Wisconsin from the Toronto Maple Leafs. Desjardins would play the majority of games with Wayne Rutledge his main backup.

Regular season
The Kings second season began with playoff expectations following a second-place finish in their inaugural season. The Kings played well enough at home to be competitive for a playoff spot, but they only won 5 road games all season.

Attendance for the season exceeded 300,000 for the first time over a 38-game home schedule.

Season standings

Record vs. opponents

Playoffs
The Kings pulled off a first round upset, knocking off their in-state rivals the Oakland Seals in seven games in the NHL Quarter-finals.  The Kings would then be swept by the St. Louis Blues in the West Division final. Bill Flett led all Kings playoff scorers with 7 points, while Eddie Joyal and Ted Irvine had 6 points each.  Irvine had 5 goals to lead the club.

Schedule and results

|- align="center"
| 1 || 12 || St. Louis Blues || 0–6  || St. Louis || 0–1–0
|- align="center"
| 2 || 13 || Oakland Seals || 4–4 || Oakland || 0-1–1
|- align="center"
| 3 || 17 || Boston Bruins || 2–1 || Los Angeles || 1–1-1
|- align="center"
| 4 || 19 || Minnesota North Stars || 1–4 || Minnesota || 1–2–1
|- align="center"
| 5 || 20 || New York Rangers || 0–7 || New York || 1–3–1
|- align="center"
| 6 || 23 || Montreal Canadiens || 2–5 || Los Angeles || 1–4–1
|- align="center"
| 7 || 26 || Philadelphia Flyers || 6–2 || Los Angeles || 2–4-1
|- align="center"
| 8 || 30 || Chicago Black Hawks || 2–4 || Los Angeles || 2–5–1
|-

|- align="center"
| 9 || 2 || Pittsburgh Penguins || 3–2 || Los Angeles || 3–5-1
|- align="center"
| 10 || 6 || New York Rangers || 2–0 || Los Angeles || 4–5-1
|- align="center"
| 11 || 9 || Toronto Maple Leafs || 3–1 || Los Angeles || 5–5-1
|- align="center"
| 12 || 12 || Oakland Seals || 3–1 || Los Angeles || 6–5-1
|- align="center"
| 13 || 14 || Detroit Red Wings || 2–5 || Los Angeles || 6–6–1
|- align="center"
| 14 || 16 || Minnesota North Stars || 2–3 || Minnesota || 6–7–1
|- align="center"
| 15 || 17 || Philadelphia Flyers || 1–3 || Philadelphia || 6–8–1
|- align="center"
| 16 || 20 || New York Rangers || 2–4 || New York || 6–9–1
|- align="center"
| 17 || 21 || Boston Bruins || 1–4 || Boston || 6–10–1
|- align="center"
| 18 || 23 || Pittsburgh Penguins || 2–2 || Pittsburgh || 6-10–2
|- align="center"
| 19 || 24 || Philadelphia Flyers || 3–1 || Philadelphia || 7–10-2
|- align="center"
| 20 || 27 || Montreal Canadiens || 2–4 || Los Angeles || 7–11–2
|- align="center"
| 21 || 30 || Pittsburgh Penguins || 2–4 || Los Angeles || 7–12–2
|-

|- align="center"
| 22 || 4 || Philadelphia Flyers || 3–1 || Los Angeles || 8–12-2
|- align="center"
| 23 || 7 || Minnesota North Stars || 3–2 || Los Angeles || 9–12-2
|- align="center"
| 24 || 11 || Detroit Red Wings || 6–3 || Los Angeles || 10–12-2
|- align="center"
| 25 || 14 || Pittsburgh Penguins || 2–1 || Pittsburgh || 11–12-2
|- align="center"
| 26 || 15 || St. Louis Blues || 1–3 || St. Louis || 11–13–2
|- align="center"
| 27 || 18 || Montreal Canadiens || 2–2 || Montreal || 11-13–3
|- align="center"
| 28 || 19 || Boston Bruins || 4–6 || Boston || 11–14–3
|- align="center"
| 29 || 21 || Philadelphia Flyers || 1–2 || Los Angeles || 11–15–3
|- align="center"
| 30 || 26 || Minnesota North Stars || 4–4 || Los Angeles || 11-15–4
|- align="center"
| 31 || 28 || Toronto Maple Leafs || 4–1 || Toronto || 12–15-4
|- align="center"
| 32 || 29 || Chicago Black Hawks || 1–4 || Chicago || 12–16–4
|-

|- align="center"
| 33 || 1 || St. Louis Blues || 0–0 || Los Angeles || 12-16–5
|- align="center"
| 34 || 5 || Oakland Seals || 0–0 || Oakland || 12-16–6
|- align="center"
| 35 || 7 || St. Louis Blues || 0–5 || St. Louis || 12–17–6
|- align="center"
| 36 || 9 || Detroit Red Wings || 2–6 || Detroit || 12–18–6
|- align="center"
| 37 || 11 || Toronto Maple Leafs || 2–4 || Toronto || 12–19–6
|- align="center"
| 38 || 12 || Chicago Black Hawks || 2–4 || Chicago || 12–20–6
|- align="center"
| 39 || 14 || New York Rangers || 3–1 || Los Angeles || 13–20-6
|- align="center"
| 40 || 16 || Chicago Black Hawks || 3–2 || Los Angeles || 14–20-6
|- align="center"
| 41 || 18 || Pittsburgh Penguins || 4–0 || Los Angeles || 15–20-6
|- align="center"
| 42 || 23 || New York Rangers || 1–3 || New York || 15–21–6
|- align="center"
| 43 || 25 || Minnesota North Stars || 2–3 || Minnesota || 15–22–6
|- align="center"
| 44 || 26 || Chicago Black Hawks || 3–9 || Chicago || 15–23–6
|- align="center"
| 45 || 29 || Toronto Maple Leafs || 3–1 || Los Angeles || 16–23-6
|- align="center"
| 46 || 30 || Boston Bruins || 5–7 || Los Angeles || 16–24–6
|-

|- align="center"
| 47 || 1 || Oakland Seals || 8–5 || Los Angeles || 17–24-6
|- align="center"
| 48 || 4 || St. Louis Blues || 4–2 || Los Angeles || 18–24-6
|- align="center"
| 49 || 6 || Montreal Canadiens || 2–4 || Los Angeles || 18–25–6
|- align="center"
| 50 || 8 || Pittsburgh Penguins || 4–2 || Pittsburgh || 19–25-6
|- align="center"
| 51 || 9 || Detroit Red Wings || 0–5 || Detroit || 19–26–6
|- align="center"
| 52 || 11 || Montreal Canadiens || 3–7 || Montreal || 19–27–6
|- align="center"
| 53 || 13 || New York Rangers || 4–1 || Los Angeles || 20–27-6
|- align="center"
| 54 || 15 || St. Louis Blues || 1–4 || St. Louis || 20–28–6
|- align="center"
| 55 || 16 || Detroit Red Wings || 3–6 || Detroit || 20–29–6
|- align="center"
| 56 || 19 || Minnesota North Stars || 4–7 || Minnesota || 20–30–6
|- align="center"
| 57 || 20 || Chicago Black Hawks || 2–6 || Los Angeles || 20–31–6
|- align="center"
| 58 || 22 || St. Louis Blues || 1–3 || Los Angeles || 20–32–6
|- align="center"
| 59 || 23 || Oakland Seals || 4–3 || Oakland || 21–32-6
|- align="center"
| 60 || 24 || Minnesota North Stars || 1–1 || Los Angeles || 21-32–7
|- align="center"
| 61 || 26 || Boston Bruins || 2–4 || Los Angeles || 21–33–7
|-

|- align="center"
| 62 || 1 || Philadelphia Flyers || 2–2 || Los Angeles || 21-33–8
|- align="center"
| 63 || 5 || Toronto Maple Leafs || 4–6 || Toronto || 21–34–8
|- align="center"
| 64 || 6 || Philadelphia Flyers || 1–5 || Philadelphia || 21–35–8
|- align="center"
| 65 || 8 || Montreal Canadiens || 3–3 || Montreal || 21-35–9
|- align="center"
| 66 || 9 || Boston Bruins || 2–7 || Boston || 21–36–9
|- align="center"
| 67 || 12 || Toronto Maple Leafs || 0–4 || Los Angeles || 21–37–9
|- align="center"
| 68 || 15 || Pittsburgh Penguins || 3–1 || Los Angeles || 22–37-9
|- align="center"
| 69 || 18 || Oakland Seals || 3–2 || Los Angeles || 23–37-9
|- align="center"
| 70 || 20 || Detroit Red Wings || 4–2 || Los Angeles || 24–37-9
|- align="center"
| 71 || 22 || Oakland Seals || 0–4 || Los Angeles || 24–38–9
|- align="center"
| 72 || 23 || Oakland Seals || 4–5 || Oakland || 24–39–9
|- align="center"
| 73 || 26 || Pittsburgh Penguins || 4–8 || Pittsburgh || 24–40–9
|- align="center"
| 74 || 27 || Philadelphia Flyers || 2–4 || Philadelphia || 24–41–9
|- align="center"
| 75 || 29 || St. Louis Blues || 1–3 || Los Angeles || 24–42–9
|- align="center"
| 76 || 30 || Minnesota North Stars || 3–3 || Los Angeles || 24-42–10
|-

Playoffs
West Division Semi-final
Los Angeles Kings vs. Oakland Seals

Los Angeles wins best-of-seven series 4–3.

West Division Final

Los Angeles Kings vs. St. Louis Blues

St. Louis wins best-of-seven series 4–0.

Player statistics

Forwards
Note: GP = Games played; G = Goals; A = Assists; Pts = Points; PIM = Penalty minutes

Defencemen
Note: GP = Games played; G = Goals; A = Assists; Pts = Points; PIM = Penalty minutes

Goaltending
Note: GP = Games played; MIN = Minutes; W = Wins; L = Losses; T = Ties; SO = Shutouts; GAA = Goals against average

Awards and records

Records

Milestones

Transactions
The Kings were involved in the following transactions during the 1968–69 season.

Trades

Reverse Draft

Intra-league Draft

Draft picks

NOTE: Back before 1979, the amateur draft was held with varying rules and procedures. In 1968, teams only needed to select as many player as they wanted to, which is why there was only one Kings player drafted.

References
 Kings on Hockey Database

Los Angeles Kings seasons
Los
Los
1968 in sports in California
1969 in sports in California